Marnie Ponton (born 16 March 1984) is an Australian long-distance runner. She competed in the senior women's race at the 2019 IAAF World Cross Country Championships. She finished in 44th place.

In 2004, she won the gold medal in the women's 3000 metres steeplechase event at the 2003–04 Australian Athletics Championships held in Sydney, Australia.

In 2018, she competed at the inaugural Commonwealth Half Marathon Championships.

In 2022, she won the Canberra Marathon.

References

External links 
 

Living people
1984 births
Place of birth missing (living people)
Australian female long-distance runners
Australian female cross country runners
Australian female steeplechase runners
Australian Athletics Championships winners
20th-century Australian women
21st-century Australian women